Nevada City may refer to:

 Nevada City, California, USA
 Nevada City, Montana, USA
 Nevada City, Nevada, USA
 Nevada City (film), a 1941 film directed by Joseph Kane

See also
 Nevada (disambiguation)